Rafiq Husain born Syed Rafiq Husain (14 May 1913 – 31 December 1990) was an Urdu writer, poet and critic from India.

Career
He served as Registrar of Co-Operative Society. On completion of his postgraduate studies, he joined Allahabad University as Lecturer on the persecution of the Vice Chancellor Amarnath Jha of Allahabad University. Later he became Chairman of Allahabad University Delegacy and Head of the Urdu Department. A competition occurred between Rafique Hussain and Firdaus Fatima Naseer for the Professorship in Urdu.

Bibliography
 Urdu Ghazal aur unski Nash-vo-Numa, 1942
 Mir Hasan ki ḥayat aur Siḥrulbayān ka tanqidi jaizah, 1960
 Dabistan, 1964,
 Guizār-E-aqīdat, 1966
 Afsanvi uṣul aur fasanah-yi ajaib, 1975
 Mas navi Siḥr al-bayan: yaʻnī, Qiṣṣah-yi Be Naẓīr va Badr-i Munīr, 1978
 Azmat-e-Marasi
 Pahli Tankid Pahla Naqad
 Mawazna Anis wa Dabir
 Masnawi Gulzar Naseem by Pt Daya Shankar "Naseem" with an introduction and notes by Rafiq Husain

See also
 List of Indian poets
 List of Indian writers

References

Urdu-language writers from India
Poets from Uttar Pradesh
Academic staff of the University of Allahabad
University of Allahabad alumni
Writers from Allahabad
Indian Shia Muslims
1990 deaths
1913 births
20th-century Indian poets